Luanda is the capital and largest city in Angola. Due to decades of civil war, Angola lacked significant development until very recently. The tallest building in the city is the 25-storey,  Intercontinental Hotel & Casino completed in 2011. Several of the tallest buildings in the Angola are currently under construction in the city. If completed, Torre De Angola at  will be the tallest building in Africa and in the top 100 tallest in the world.

Luanda's history is one that involves a lot of destruction and strife. However, due to the end of the civil war in 2002, Luanda is undergoing massive reconstruction and economic development. Angola is becoming one of the most advanced countries in Africa with the highest concentration of development currently on the African Continent. All of the city's high rises have been constructed within the last 6 years, a product of investment in the nation's vast oil reserves.

After this skyscraper boom, Luanda's skyline will have dramatically changed.

Tallest buildings
This includes spires and architectural details but does not include antenna masts.

Projects

Under construction, approved

Proposed, on-hold

See also

 List of tallest buildings in Africa
 List of tallest buildings in South Africa
 List of tallest buildings in Zimbabwe
 List of tallest buildings and structures in South Africa
 List of tallest buildings in Canada

References

Tallest
Angola, Luanda
Tallest, Luanda